The United Textile Workers of America (UTW) was a North American trade union established in 1901.

History
The United Textile Workers of America was founded following two conferences in 1901 under the aegis of the American Federation of Labor (AFL) as an amalgamation of several smaller craft unions. AFL first vice president James Duncan presided over a two day initial conference held at Boston's Quincy House Hotel in May before a larger conference finalized the organization in November. The union's most important early leader was John Golden, a Lancashire-born spinner from Fall River, Massachusetts. Golden was elected as the union's second president in 1902 and re-elected at each subsequent convention until his death in 1921. At the time of his election, UTW's membership was just 10,600 spread out among 185 local unions. During that time, UTW engaged in intense competition with the Industrial Workers of the World (IWW) for the allegiance of textile workers across the northeastern United States. Generally opposed to strikes as a means of solving industrial disputes, the UTW frequently collaborated with company officials and sent union members to act as strikebreakers to IWW-led strikes, including the 1907 Skowhegan textile strike, the 1912 Lawrence textile strike, and the 1913 Paterson silk strike. As such, it had limited success prior to the 1930s, and the union claimed about 350,000 members at the time of a general textile strike in 1934. A year later in 1935, it became a founding member of the Committee for Industrial Organizations, whose Textile Workers Organizing Committee established the basis for a new union, the Textile Workers Union of America, founded in 1939. A diminished UTW continued separately after 1939 and, in 1996, merged with the United Food and Commercial Workers International Union.

Publications
From its founding in 1901 until 1912, UTW used the privately-published The Laborer and Journeyman as its official organ. In 1912, The Textile Worker was founded and published by the union itself with secretary-treasurer Albert Hibbert as its editor. In September 1915, John Golden took over as editor on top of his other duties as president. He was replaced in both roles following his death by Thomas F. McMahon.

Leadership

Presidents
1901: James Tansey
1902: John Golden
1921: Thomas F. McMahon
1937: Frank Gorman
1939: C. M. Fox
1941: Frank Gorman
1944: Anthony Valente
1958: George Baldanzi
1972: Francis Schaufenbil
1986: Vernon Mustard
1991: Ron Myslowka

Other leaders
 Sara Agnes Mclaughlin Conboy,  secretary-treasurer

See also
 1914–1915 Fulton Bag and Cotton Mills strike
 Textile workers strike (1934)

References

1901 establishments in the United States
1939 disestablishments in the United States
American Federation of Labor
Textile and clothing trade unions
Defunct trade unions in the United States

External links
 PBS:  The Uprising of '34